Andrea Betzner (born 10 July 1966) is a former German tennis player. Betzner won two WTA doubles titles during her tennis career. In Fed Cup, she played in 1985 in the German team.

Andrea has competed in the Australian Open, at Wimbledon, the French Open, the US Open and many other events.

Book author
She has written a book about tennis. Its German title is Unterschiede der Treffstabilität im Tennis: der Einfluß von körperlicher Reife und sportartspezifischer Belastung.  This roughly translates as Differences in accuracy stability in tennis: the influence of physical maturity and sport-specific loading.

WTA finals

Doubles (2–1)

ITF Finals

Singles (0–2)

Doubles (1–0)

References

External links
 
 
 

German female tennis players
1966 births
Living people
West German female tennis players
Tennis people from Baden-Württemberg